Nicolae Mișu (August 6, 1858 – August 31, 1924) was a Romanian politician and diplomat who served as the Minister of Foreign Affairs of Romania.

Life and political career
Mișu completed a law degree in Germany and political science studies in Paris. He was the first envoy of the Romanian monarch in Bulgaria. He also served as the Envoy Extraordinary and Plenipotentiary to Vienna, Constantinople and London. While in London, he lobbied for protection of interests of Aromanians in Pind Mountains. He was also involved in discussions on rights of Jewish minority of Dobruja when it was split between Romania and Bulgaria.
From October 15 until November 30, 1919 Mișu was Minister of Foreign Affairs of Romania within the Artur Văitoianu cabinet during which Romania became a signatory to the Treaty of Saint-Germain-en-Laye.

He died on August 31, 1924 in Bucharest.

See also
Foreign relations of Romania

References

Romanian Ministers of Foreign Affairs
1858 births
1924 deaths
Grand Crosses of the Order of the White Lion